This is a list of films prominently featuring puppets.
 Die Abenteuer des Prinzen Achmed (The Adventures of Prince Achmed) (1925) - Germany
 Puppet Show (1936) - USA
 Špalíček (The Czech Year) (1947) - Czechoslovakia
 Císařův slavík (The Emperor's Nightingale) (1949) - Czechoslovakia
 Román S Basou (The Novel With The Double-Bass) (1949) - Czechoslovakia
 Certuv mlýn (The Devil's Mill) (1949) - Czechoslovakia
 Arie prerie (Song of the Prairie) (1949) - Czechoslovakia
  Bajaja (The Prince Bayaya) (1950) - Czechoslovakia
 Lili (1953) - USA
 Staré pověsti české (Old Czech Legends) (1953) - Czechoslovakia
 Dobrý voják Švejk (The Good Soldier Schweik) (1955) - Czechoslovakia
 Sen noci svatojánské (A Midsummer Night's Dream) (1959) - Czechoslovakia

 Ruka (The Hand) (1965) - Czechoslovakia
 Thunderbirds Are GO (1966) - UK
 Thunderbird 6 (1968) - UK
 Pufnstuf (film) (1970) - USA
 Let My Puppets Come (1976) - USA
 The Muppet Movie (1979) - USA
 The Great Muppet Caper (1981) - USA
 The Dark Crystal (1982) - USA/UK
 Return of the Jedi (1983) - USA
 The Neverending Story (1984) - USA/West Germany 
 Gremlins (1984) - US
 The Muppets Take Manhattan (1984) - USA
 Sesame Street Presents Follow That Bird (1985) - USA
 Labyrinth (1986) - UK
 Street of Crocodiles (1986) - UK
 Little Shop of Horrors (1986) - USA
 Superstar: The Karen Carpenter Story (1987) - USA
 Meet the Feebles (1989) - New Zealand
 Puppet Master (film) (1989) - USA
 Gremlins 2: The New Batch (1990) - USA
 The NeverEnding Story II: The Next Chapter (1990) - USA/West Germany
 The Muppet Christmas Carol (1992) - USA
 Muppet Treasure Island (1996) - USA
 Mystery Science Theater 3000: The Movie (1996) - USA
 Barney's Great Adventure (1998) - USA
 The Adventures of Elmo in Grouchland (1999) - USA
 Muppets from Space (1999) - USA
 Legend of the Sacred Stone (2000) - Taiwan
 Strings (2004) - Denmark/Norway/Sweden/UK
 Team America: World Police (2004) - USA
 Dante's Inferno (2007) - USA
 31 minutos, la película (2008) - Chile/Brazil/Spain
 Forgetting Sarah Marshall (2008) - USA
 The Beaver (2011) - USA
 The Muppets (2011) - USA
 The Greyness of Autumn -  (2012) - Scotland
 Muppets Most Wanted (2014) - USA
 Lessons Learned (2014, short film) - USA
 Scooby-Doo! Adventures: The Mystery Map (2014) - USA
 The Happytime Murders (2018) - USA
 Christopher Robin (2018) - USA
 Gulabo Sitabo -  (2020) - India
 Autumn Never Dies -  (2020) - Scotland
 A Fairy Tale After All (2022) - USA
 Abruptio (2023) - USA
 The rise and fall of the Chop Chop Show'' (2022) - Argentina

See also
 List of highest-grossing puppet films

References

Puppetry
Puppetry